The greenfin shiner ('Cyprinella chloristia'') is a species of fish in the family Cyprinidae. It is endemic to the United States, where it occurs in the Santee River drainage in North Carolina and South Carolina, and the Peedee River drainage in South Carolina.This species reaches a length of

References

Jordan D. S., and A. W. Brayton. 1878. Contributions to North American ichthyology, based primarily on the collections of the United States National Museum. III. A.-On the distribution of the fishes of the Alleghany region of South Carolina, Georgia, and Tennessee, with descriptions of new or little known species. Bull. U. S. Nat. Mus. 12:1-95.
Page, L.M. and B.M. Burr, 2011. A field guide to freshwater fishes of North America north of Mexico. Boston : Houghton Mifflin Harcourt, 663p. 

Cyprinella
Taxa named by David Starr Jordan
Taxa named by A. W. Brayton
Fish described in 1878